The Bern Symphony Orchestra (Berner Symphonie-Orchester) is a Swiss orchestra based in Bern. The orchestra primarily gives concerts at the Kursaal in Bern, and also acts as the orchestra of the Bern Theatre, for opera and dance performances.  The orchestra is under the auspices of the Stiftung Berner Symphonieorchester, and receives government funding from the federal government of Switzerland and the canton and city of Bern.

The orchestra was founded in 1877.  Since 2010, the orchestra's chief conductor is Mario Venzago.

Chief conductors
 Karl Munzinger (1896–1909)
 Fritz Brun (1909–1941)
 Luc Balmer (1941–1964)
 Paul Kletzki (1964–1968)
 Charles Dutoit (1968–1978)
 Gustav Kuhn (1979–1983)
 Peter Maag (1984–1991)
 Dmitri Kitajenko (1991–2004)
 Andrey Boreyko (2004–2010)
 Mario Venzago (2010–present)

References

External links
 Official German-language website of the Bern Symphony Orchestra
 City of Bern English-language page on the Bern Symphony Orchestra

1877 establishments in Switzerland

Swiss orchestras
Culture in Bern
Musical groups established in 1877